The Route Masters: Running London's Roads is a British documentary television series produced by Blast! Films for the BBC. Narrated by Julian Barratt, the series launched on BBC Two on 18 June 2013. The series shows how Transport for London keeps London's traffic moving.

Production
On 6 June 2013 Janice Hadlow, the controller of BBC Two, announced the series along with several other documentaries. The series was filmed over a year.

The series is now repeated on Watch.

Episode list

Reception

Ratings
The first episode attracted 2.45 million viewers for BBC Two. It was watched by 10.7% of television viewers during its original broadcast. The second episode was viewed by 1.9 million people, attaining an 8.2% share of the audience during broadcast. The third episode was viewed by 1.96 million people, with an audience share of 8%. The fourth episode received 1.87 million viewers, an 8.3% share during broadcast. The penultimate episode was watched by 1.95 million people, with an audience share of 8.2%.

Critical reception

Episode 1
Writing in The Independent, Tom Sutcliffe was disappointed by the way the events were presented and said that the episode "was saved by its characters". Keith Watson of the Metro said that the episode "may have intended to arouse our sympathy for those who keep our streets moving – it didn't". The Guardians John Crace said that the episode "did have its moments" and that the gridlock theme was "hard to make interesting – and it wasn't very." David Crawford said that Airport Live should have been more like this episode, where you "find the one person who can describe well the complexities of the job, to give you the nuts and bolts of your doc; then find all the characters among the workers who perform the myriad tasks" to make it more interesting. Phil Harrison said that the episode was "perfectly watchable but, with the best will in the world, very missable too".

Episode 2
Bim Adewunmi, writing for the New Statesman, said the episode "was simply excellent" and that London was "nowhere more beautifully portrayed than on BBC2's The Route Masters: Running London's Roads". Bryan Scott wrote a guide in the Metro on whom to avoid on the night bus home based on this episode.

Episode 3
Writing in The Independent, Tom Sutcliffe said that the episode "was much funnier and sweeter than the original [Episode 1]".

Episode 4
The Express & Star said the episode "provided a fascinating insight into one of the country's busiest stations showing you the hard work that goes into ensuring journeys run smoothly and keeping the city moving".

DVD
The Route Masters: Running London's Roads was released onto DVD by Delta Entertainment on 25 August 2014.

See also
 The Tube (2012 TV series)
 London Buses
 London Streets

References

External links
 
 
 
 Agreement between Blast! Films and Transport for London

2013 British television series debuts
2014 British television series endings
BBC television documentaries
Television shows set in London
English-language television shows
Road transport in London